Fyodor Kukin (born February 26, 1993) is a Russian former professional ice hockey goaltender.

Kukin played one game in Kontinental Hockey League with Yugra Khanty-Mansiysk during the 2013-14 KHL season. He signed for HC Plzeň of the Czech Extraliga in 2015 but never played a game for the team.

References

External links

1993 births
Living people
SHK Hodonín players
Mamonty Yugry players
Sportspeople from Arkhangelsk
Russian ice hockey goaltenders
THK Tver players
HC Yugra players
Russian expatriate sportspeople in the Czech Republic
Russian expatriate ice hockey people
Expatriate ice hockey players in the Czech Republic